Lannercost is a rural locality in the Shire of Hinchinbrook, Queensland, Australia.

History 
Long Pocket State School opened on 26 July 1915 and closed on 14 February 1994. It was at 2062 Abergowrie Road, now in Lannercost.

Lannercost State School opened on 24 October 1929 and closed on 10 September 1962. It was on Lannercost Extension Road near the junction with Venables Crossing Road.

Education 
There are no schools in Lannercost. The nearest primary school is Trebonne State School in neighbouring Trebonne to the south-east. The nearest secondary school is Ingham State High School in Ingham to the south-east.

References 

Shire of Hinchinbrook
Localities in Queensland